Zhan Houshun is a lieutenant general (zhong jiang) of the People's Liberation Army Air Force (PLAAF) of China. He has served as commander of the Chengdu Military Region Air Force and deputy commander of the Chengdu MR since 2013.

Zhan Houshun was born in Heilongjiang Province. He served as commander of the PLAAF Changchun Forward Headquarters of the Shenyang Military Region, and was later transferred to the Chengdu Military Region Air Force (MRAF), where he served as chief of staff and deputy commander. In early 2013, he was promoted to commander of the Chengdu MRAF as well as deputy commander of the Chengdu MR, replacing Lieutenant General Fang Dianrong. Zhan attained the rank of lieutenant general on 16 July 2014.

In May 2014, Zhan Houshun oversaw the three-week-long joint Sino-Pakistani Shaheen-III Air Exercise.

References

Living people
People's Liberation Army Air Force generals
People's Liberation Army generals from Heilongjiang
Year of birth missing (living people)